Alexandru Leitner (born 1901, date of death unknown) was a Romanian footballer who played as a defender.

International career
Alexandru Leitner played one friendly match for Romania, on 2 September 1923 under coach Teofil Morariu in a 1–1 against Poland.

References

External links
 

1901 births
Year of death missing
Romanian footballers
Romania international footballers
Place of birth missing
Association football defenders
Victoria Cluj players